A81 or A-81 may refer to:
 A81 Music  Recording artist A81 Los Angeles California 1988-Present 
 A81 motorway (France)
 A81 road (Scotland)
 A81 motorway (Germany)
 Dutch Defence, in the Encyclopaedia of Chess Openings
 RFA Brambleleaf (A81), a Royal Fleet Auxiliary Tanker
 Iceberg A-81, iceberg that calved from the Brunt Ice Shelf in January 2023